In molecular biology, the protein domain Zeta (ζ) toxin refers to a protein domain found in prokaryotes, which acts as a UDP-N-acetylglucosamine kinase. Its function is to inhibit cell wall biosynthesis and it may act as a bactericide in nature. It is also thought that Zeta toxin induces reversible protective dormancy and permeation to propidium iodide (PI).

Mechanism
This protein family entry consists of several bacterial zeta toxin proteins. Zeta toxin is thought to be part of a postsegregational killing (PSK) system involved in the killing of plasmid-free cells. It relies on antitoxin/toxin systems that secure stable inheritance of low and medium copy number plasmids during cell division and kill cells that have lost the plasmid.

Structure
The Zeta Toxin is folded like a phosphotransferase. This domain features an α/β structure and the central twisted β-sheet contains six β-strands. The first 5 strands are parallel but β-strand 6 is antiparallel and connected by a short loop to β-strand 5. α-Helices are inserted between and flank the β-strands.

References

Protein families